Myrtle Creek is a locality in the City of Greater Bendigo and Mount Alexander Shire, Victoria.

References 

Suburbs of Bendigo
Bendigo